Bald Head is a bare, ice-free headland on Yatrus Promontory situated  southwest of View Point on the south side of Trinity Peninsula on the Antarctic Peninsula in Antarctica. It was probably first seen in 1902–03 by J. Gunnar Andersson's party of the Swedish Antarctic Expedition under Otto Nordenskiöld. The Falkland Islands Dependencies Survey charted it and applied the descriptive name in 1945.

Map
 Trinity Peninsula. Scale 1:250000 topographic map No. 5697. Institut für Angewandte Geodäsie and British Antarctic Survey, 1996.

References 

Headlands of Trinity Peninsula